Ab Garm (also Romanized as Āb Garm) is a village in Hamaijan Rural District, Hamaijan District, Sepidan County, Fars Province, Iran. At the 2006 census, its population was 358, in 88 families.

References 

Populated places in Sepidan County